The Wings of Change Twister is an Austrian single-place paraglider that was designed by Markus Gründhammer and produced by Wings of Change of Fulpmes, starting in 2003. It is now out of production.

Design and development
The Twister was designed as an intermediate glider. Gründhammer describes his design as "a perfect synthesis of aesthetics, performance and safety". The Twister Xi variant had a slightly reduced glider weight.

The models are each named for their relative size.

Variants
Twister S
Small-sized model for lighter pilots. The glider model is Deutscher Hängegleiterverband e.V. (DHV) LTF/EN B certified.
Twister M
Mid-sized model for medium-weight pilots. The glider model is DHV LTF/EN B certified.
Twister L
Large-sized model for heavier pilots. The glider model is DHV LTF/EN B certified.

Specifications (Twister M)

References

External links

Twister
Paragliders